Rick Batalla is an actor, theatre director and playwright.

Biography
He grew up in Santa Monica.
He has worked both in front of the camera as a series regular (Payne, HUD, True Love), and as a guest star (Married... with Children, Living Single, Brooklyn South, 8 Simple Rules) on various television shows, and in films like Eraser with Arnold Schwarzenegger, and Gia with Angelina Jolie.

Rick is also involved in LA Theater. He is a founding member of the Troubadour Theater Company, which takes current music, and sets it to the plays of Shakespeare.

Plays
 My Mexican Life
 Blake…Da Musical, Ovation Award-winning musical about Robert Blake
 "CHiPs The Musical"

References

External links
Artist's website

Living people
1962 births
Male actors from Santa Monica, California
20th-century American dramatists and playwrights
Writers from Santa Monica, California